The Chinese Temples Committee is a statutory body in Hong Kong established in 1928 under the Chinese Temples Ordinance (Cap. 153). It is mainly responsible for the operation and management of twenty-four temples directly under its management. It also handles temple registration. There are 20 additional temples, of which management has been delegated to other organisations.

Organisation
The Committee is chaired by the Secretary for Home Affairs. It consists of eight persons, including the chairman of the board of directors of the Tung Wah Group of Hospitals and six persons appointed by the Secretary for Home Affairs through delegated authority by the Chief Executive.

Administered temples
Twenty-four temples are directly administered by the Chinese Temples Committee:

 Lin Fa Kung, Tai Hang
 Yuk Wong Kung Din, A Kung Ngam, Shau Kei Wan
 Tin Hau Temple, Aberdeen
 Tam Kung and Tin Hau Temples, Wong Nai Chung
 Tin Hau Temple, Shau Kei Wan
 Shing Wong Temple, Shau Kei Wan
 Tam Kung Temple, A Kung Ngam, Shau Kei Wan
 Kwun Yum Temple, Ap Lei Chau
 Hung Shing Temple, Ap Lei Chau
 Pak Tai Temple, Wan Chai
 Tin Hau Temple, To Kwa Wan
 Kwun Yum Temple, Hung Hom
 Tin Hau Temple, Cha Kwo Ling
 Sam Tai Tze & Pak Tai Temples, Sham Shui Po
 Tin Hau Temple, Sham Shui Po
 Kwan Tai Temple (Mo Tai Temple), Sham Shui Po
 Hau Wong Temple, Junction Road
 Hau Wong Temple, Tai O
 Tin Hau Temple, Joss House Bay
 Che Kung Temple, Sha Tin
 Tin Hau Temple, Peng Chau
 Pak Tai Temple, Cheung Chau
 Hung Shing Temple, Cheung Chau
 Pak Tai Temple, Hok Yuen Kok (Ma Tau Wai Road)

Delegated temples
The management of twenty temples has been delegated to other organizations:

 Hung Shing Temple, Wan Chai
 Tin Hau Temple, Stanley
 Pak Tai Temple, Stanley
 Tai Wong Temple, Stanley
 To Tei Temple, Stanley
 Shui Sin Temple, Stanley
 To Che Fat She
 Tin Hau Temple, Shek O 
 Tin Hau Temple, Yau Ma Tei
 Shea Tan, Yau Ma Tei
 Fook Tak Tsz, Yau Ma Tei
 Shing Wong Temple, Yau Ma Tei
 The School, Yau Ma Tei
 Shui Yuet Kung, Shantung Street
 Hung Shing Temple, Fuk Tsun Street
 Kwun Yum Temple, Tsz Wan Shan
 Sik Sik Yuen's Wong Tai Sin Temple 
 Tin Hau Temple, Wong Lung Hang, Tung Chung
 Hau Wong Temple, Tung Chung
 Tin Hau Temple, Tai Shek Hau (Chung Hing Street), Cheung Chau

See also
 Taai Ping Ching Jiu (太平清醮)
 Tin Hau temples in Hong Kong
 Kwan Tai temples in Hong Kong
 Hip Tin temples in Hong Kong
 Hong Kong Government Lunar New Year kau chim tradition
 Taoism in Hong Kong
 Places of worship in Hong Kong

References

External links

 Official website
 Chinese Temples Ordinance (Chapter 153)

Religious organisations based in Hong Kong
Religion in Hong Kong
Statutory bodies in Hong Kong
1928 establishments in Hong Kong